Exec or EXEC may refer to:

 Executive officer, a person responsible for running an organization
 Executive producer, provides finance and guidance for the making of a commercial entertainment product
 A family of kit helicopters produced by RotorWay International
 An abbreviation for executive

Computing 
 exec (computing), an operating system function for running a program
 eval, a programming language function for executing a statement or evaluating an expression, variously called exec or eval
 Exec (Amiga), the OS kernel of Amiga computers
 CMS EXEC, an interpreted command procedure control language for IBM's VM/CMS operating system
 EXEC 2, an interpreted command procedure control language for IBM's VM/CMS operating system
 UNIVAC EXEC I, the original operating system developed for the UNIVAC 1107
 UNIVAC EXEC II, an operating system developed for the UNIVAC 1107 and ported to the UNIVAC 1108
 UNIVAC EXEC 8, a.k.a. EXEC VIII, an operating system developed for the UNIVAC 1108

See also 
 Executable
 Executive (disambiguation)
 Non-executive director (also known as non-exec)
 Exec Shield
 Exec (errand service)